Negative Burn is a black-and-white anthology comic book published beginning in 1993 by Caliber Press, and subsequently by Image Comics and Desperado Publishing. Edited by Joe Pruett, Negative Burn is noted for its eclectic range of genres, mixture of established comics veterans and new talents, and promotion of creative experimentation.

Publication history
The first volume of Negative Burn ended with issue #50 in 1997. Revived by Image and Desperado in 2005 with two seasonal specials, Negative Burn returned to a monthly format in 2006. The first eleven issues of the new volume were published by Image, while the final ten issues were published by Desperado.

A typical issue of Negative Burn might include a number of stand-alone stories; a new chapter of a longer, serialized piece; recurring features such as Brian Bolland's "Mr. Mamoulian"; and a sketchbook section. The sketchbook featured studies, rough drawings, and never-before-seen artwork by a single illustrator. Artists such as Dave Dorman, Michael William Kaluta, David Mazzucchelli, Terry Moore, P. Craig Russell, Greg Ruth, Charles Vess, and even Neil Gaiman have been featured in the sketchbook section.

Desperado Publisher Pruett views the new incarnation of Negative Burn is a potential launching pad for new creators: "I'm offering Negative Burn as a way for a new creator to break in with us. If a creator shows promise and potential with his/her short story contributions then I might try to find them work with an already established creator or title in our library of titles, such as Dalibor Talajic and Federico Dallocchio with Deadworld and Will Volley with Antoine Sharp. I believe there needs to be an outlet for new talent . . . and [I] will try to do what I can to help them".

Regarding Negative Burn'''s sales in 2007, Pruett said "it has the advantage of being a well-known commodity from its long run in the 90’s, but even then it suffers from the consistent month-to-month drop in sales that is the rule of thumb in the marketplace. As long as we can break even with Negative Burn I’ll keep it going".

The title was scheduled to return for a third time, as a yearly, in 2009 from Desperado as a 200-page trade paperback anthology. After a November 2009 announcement that Desperado was becoming an imprint of IDW Publishing the paperback was canceled and was re-solicited in April 2010 to be published in June by IDW Publishing but has since been canceled..

 Creators 
Notable Negative Burn contributors include Brian Bolland, Alan Moore, P. Craig Russell, Doug Wheeler, Dave Johnson, Dave Gibbons, Evan Dorkin, Phil Hester, Arthur Adams, Edvin Biuković, Bob Burden, Zander Cannon, Mark Chiarello, Guy Davis, Michael Gaydos, Dean Haspiel, Darko Macan, Mike Wieringo, Terry Moore, Brian Michael Bendis, Josh Neufeld, Ron Kasman, Patton Oswalt, Paul Pope, Jim Mahfood, Moebius, Roxanne Starr, Mike Perkins and Tony Harris.

 Awards Negative Burn has been nominated for over twenty comics industry awards, including the Harvey Award, the Eisner Award, the Eagle Award, the Don Thompson Award, and many others. In addition, the collection Negative Burn: The Best from 1993-1998 was named by Diamond Comic Distributors' Scoop e-newsletter as a Top Ten Trade Paperback of 2005.

 Collected editions 
 The Best of Negative Burn, Year One (128 pages, Caliber Press, 1994, Stabur Press, 1995)
 The Best of Negative Burn, Year Two (128 pages, Caliber Press, 1995, Stabur Press, 1996)
 Negative Burn: The Best from 1993-1998'' (200 pages, Image Comics, 1999, 2005)

Notes

References

External links 
 Negative Burn at Caliber website
 Negative Burn contributor checklist

Image Comics titles
Comics anthologies
1993 comics debuts
2006 comics debuts